The 2014–15 Morelia season is the 68th professional season of Mexico's top-flight football league. The season is split into two tournaments—the Torneo Apertura and the Torneo Clausura—each with identical formats and each contested by the same eighteen teams. Morelia began their season on July 20, 2014 against Toluca, Morelia played most of their homes games on Fridays at 9:30 local time.

Torneo Apertura

Squad

Regular season

Apertura 2014 results

Goalscorers

Regular season

Source:

Results

Results summary

Results by round

References

Morelia
Atlético Morelia